Wapella is a village in DeWitt County, Illinois, United States. The population was 513 at the 2020 census.

History 
Wapella was founded in 1854, but settlers were arriving in Wapella as early as 1829 due to the dense timber and rich soil. The name of the village comes from Chief Wapella of the Musquakee Indian tribe. A group of settlers from Kentucky were the first Europeans to call Wapella home.  A short time later a substantial group of Irish immigrants moved to Wapella to build and work on the Illinois Central Railroad. Wapella was laid out by David Neil, vice president and a surveyor of the Illinois Central Railroad Line. The village population was approximately 500 residents by the beginning of the Civil War.

Geography

Demographics

As of the 2020 census there were 513 people, 210 households, and 127 families residing in the village. The racial makeup of the village was 95.32% White, 0.19% African American, 0.19% Asian, 0.39% Pacific Islander, 0.19% from other races, and 3.70% from two or more races. Hispanic or Latino of any race were 1.75% of the population.

There were 210 households, out of which 41.43% had children under the age of 18 living with them, 43.33% were married couples living together, 8.57% had a female householder with no husband present, and 39.52% were non-families. 35.24% of all households were made up of individuals, and 19.05% had someone living alone who was 65 years of age or older. The average household size was 2.71 and the average family size was 2.26.

The village's age distribution consisted of 18.4% under the age of 18, 9.3% from 18 to 24, 27.6% from 25 to 44, 24.5% from 45 to 64, and 20.3% who were 65 years of age or older. The median age was 43.6 years. For every 100 females, there were 86.6 males. For every 100 females age 18 and over, there were 87.9 males.

The median income for a household in the village was $60,625, and the median income for a family was $73,125. Males had a median income of $43,750 versus $19,583 for females. The per capita income for the village was $29,993. About 3.1% of families and 8.6% of the population were below the poverty line, including 0.0% of those under age 18 and 8.3% of those age 65 or over.

References

External links
Village of Wapella
Wapella.com Homepage

Villages in DeWitt County, Illinois
Villages in Illinois
Populated places established in 1854
1854 establishments in Illinois